Leony Léonard Kweuke (born 12 July 1987) is a retired Cameroonian footballer.

Career 
On 18 December 2008, Kweuke's club DAC Dunajská Streda loaned him to Eintracht Frankfurt to play in the German Bundesliga. For the 2009–10 season, he was loaned to Energie Cottbus. On 10 June 2010, DAC announced his return after two years in Germany, but he was sold to Sparta Prague. Kweuke was banned by the league in May 2013 after receiving a red card in a Czech Cup match against Mladá Boleslav. The dismissal was for a tackle which broke the leg of defender Radek Dosoudil in two places. The ban, to last for 12 matches, was the longest-ever punishment issued by the Czech league.

International goals
Scores and results list Cameroon's goal tally first.

Honours

Club 
Czech Republic Football Supercup: 2010
Czech First League Runner-up: 2010–2011, 2011–12, 2012–13

Individual

Czech First League Foreign footballer of the season by the readers of "iDNES.cz": 2010–2011
Czech First League Discovery of the season: 2010–2011
Czech First League All Stars media: 2010–11

Personal life 
Kweuke is a relative of Samuel Eto'o.

References

External links
 Léonard Kweuke at kicker.de 

1987 births
Living people
Cameroonian footballers
Cameroonian expatriate footballers
FC Energie Cottbus players
Esteghlal F.C. players
Eintracht Frankfurt players
Steel Azin F.C. players
AC Sparta Prague players
Çaykur Rizespor footballers
Association football forwards
Slovak Super Liga players
FC DAC 1904 Dunajská Streda players
Expatriate footballers in Germany
Bundesliga players
2. Bundesliga players
Czech First League players
Süper Lig players
Footballers from Yaoundé
Cameroonian expatriate sportspeople in Germany
Expatriate footballers in the Czech Republic
Cameroonian expatriate sportspeople in the Czech Republic
Expatriate footballers in Turkey
Cameroonian expatriate sportspeople in Turkey
Expatriate footballers in Iran
Cameroonian expatriate sportspeople in Iran
Expatriate footballers in Slovakia
Cameroonian expatriate sportspeople in Slovakia
2015 Africa Cup of Nations players
Cameroon international footballers